The women's relay competition at the Biathlon World Championships 2019 was held on 16 March 2019.

Results
The race was started at 13:15.

References

Women's relay